La Madame is a 2013 Spanish-language series produced by RTI Producciones with collaboration from Sierralta Entertainment Group for the Mexican television network Canal de las Estrellas and the United States television network UniMás. Alicia Machado stars as the protagonist.

From August 26 to October 9, 2013, UniMás broadcast La Madame on weeknights at 10pm/9c, replacing Clorofomo, and from October 14, 2013, on weeknights at 7pm/6c. The last episode was broadcast on October 31, 2013.

Cast

Main cast

United States broadcast 
 Release dates, episode name and length, and ratings based on UniMás' broadcast.

Broadcasters

References

2013 telenovelas
RTI Producciones telenovelas
Colombian telenovelas
Spanish-language American telenovelas
2013 American television series debuts
2013 American television series endings
2013 Colombian television series debuts
2013 Colombian television series endings